University Paideia is a United States 501(c)(3) non-profit organisation founded by Stanford University alumni Jack Schneider and Michael Dunson. The program is an intensive four week summer institute designed to give low-income students a greater sense of educational self-efficacy, a higher level of comfort in an academic environment, and a greater ability to make connections between different topics and ideas. The program also has a second objective – exposing college undergraduates interested in teaching to working with talented underserved students.

In its inaugural summer, 2008, the program brought together three undergraduates and 13 low-income students in a curriculum focused on teaching and learning. The program culminated in three days of school, designed and run by teams of four to five high school students and one undergraduate.

The aim is to:
 improve the educational outcomes of high achieving minority students by using the expertise of former and prospective teachers to provide high school students time and space for self-cultivation and the pursuit of their intellectual passions.
 To encourage talented undergraduates to enter into the teaching profession, and to do so in underserved communities.

This aim is pursued through a summer institute that will bring high school students, undergraduate prospective teachers, and former teachers together in a program that breaks down traditional school roles and enables the individuals involved to learn from each other.

References

External links
 Official website

Non-profit organizations based in San Francisco